Aspen Hill is a farmhouse, built about 1840 near Charles Town, Virginia (now in West Virginia), by James G. Hurst, a middle-tier farmer and landowner, who sought to build a residence befitting his rising status. The house occupies a middle ground between the grand mansions of the landed gentry and the more humble dwellings of more modest farmers.  The house lacks some of the details and craftsmanship present in more substantial houses.

References

Houses on the National Register of Historic Places in West Virginia
Houses in Jefferson County, West Virginia
Greek Revival houses in West Virginia
Houses completed in 1840
National Register of Historic Places in Jefferson County, West Virginia
Plantation houses in West Virginia